Chileatole is a Mexican cuisine dish. It is a type of thick soup made of corn masa or corn kernels, which is cooked with corn chunks, epazote, salt, and a sauce made of chili peppers and pumpkin leaves. It is served hot.

References

Mexican soups